Stempenyu: A Jewish Novel is an 1888 Yiddish Language novel by Sholem Aleichem based loosely on the life of klezmer violinist Stempenyu. It his first novel and remained one of his most popular; it was reprinted multiple times and adapted into various stage and film versions, including a play with music composed by Joseph Achron and one adapted by Sholem Aleichem himself for Boris Thomashefsky's theatre.

The title character is an exceptionally talented itinerant klezmer violinist who seduces a woman in every town he visits. In one town, while playing at a wedding, he is attracted to one of the guests, Rachel, a talented singer. She, discontented with her marriage to the boring Moyshe-Mendl, finds herself drawn in by Stempenyu's music, who likewise finds his love for her an escape from his jealous and miserly wife Freydl. Stempenyu sends Rachel an almost illiterate love letter; she agrees to meet him, ostensibly to chide him for writing it but also because she is fascinated by him. However, a vision of her friend Chaya-Etel, who had been married against her will and then died, appears and she flees. She and her husband move to a different town, where they have a child and he becomes a successful businessman; Stempenyu and Freydl remain unhappily married and childless, though she also becomes a successful shopkeeper.

The novel is dedicated to S. Y. Abramovitz, who appears as "Mendele the Bookpeddler." It was adapted in 1905 as the play Jewish Daughters (Yidishe Tekhter).

References

External links
 Original edition of Stempenyu (in Yiddish) on HathiTrust

1888 novels
Novels by Sholem Aleichem
19th-century Russian novels